Cauan Lucas Barros da Luz (born 6 May 2004), known as Barros or Cauan Barros, is a Brazilian footballer who plays as a midfielder for Vasco da Gama.

Club career
Cauan Barros began his career with Primavera in São Paulo, before his performances at the São Paulo championships attracted the attention of Vasco da Gama, and he went on to join Vasco da Gama in 2019. He signed his first professional contract in 2021.

Personal life
Cauan Barros is of indigenous Pankararu descent.

Career statistics

Club

References

2004 births
Living people
Brazilian footballers
Association football midfielders
CR Vasco da Gama players